The  is a national expressway in Kyoto Prefecture. It is owned and operated primarily by the West Nippon Expressway Company (NEXCO West Japan) and the Kyoto Prefecture Road Corporation. The route is signed E9 under Ministry of Land, Infrastructure, Transport and Tourism's  "2016 Proposal for Realization of Expressway Numbering."

Route description
The expressway is owned by the Kyoto Prefecture Road Corporation from its northern terminus to Tamba Interchange where ownership switches over to NEXCO West Japan for the remainder of the route south to Ōyamazaki Junction.

Junction list
The entire expressway is in Kyoto Prefecture.
TB= Toll booth, PA= Parking Area

|colspan="8" style="text-align: center;"|Through to  San'in Kinki Expressway

|colspan="8" style="text-align: center;"|Through to  Keiji Bypass

See also

Japan National Route 478
West Nippon Expressway Company

References

External links

Expressways in Japan
Roads in Kyoto Prefecture
1988 establishments in Japan